China International Trust and Investment (CITIC) Plaza is an 80-storey,  office skyscraper in the  Tianhe District of Guangzhou, Guangdong, People's Republic of China. Its structural height includes two antenna-like spires on the top. Completed in June 1997, it was the tallest concrete building in the world until the completion of the Trump Tower Chicago, and the tallest in China. Currently, it ranks as the eighteenth-tallest building in China, 24th-tallest in Asia, and 35th-tallest worldwide.

Located in the growing and expanding Tianhe District, it is part of a complex of the same name which also consists of two 38-storey residential buildings. Its proximity includes a new train station which serves the extremely busy Guangzhou-Shenzhen and Guangzhou-Hong Kong railways. A new metro station, and the Tianhe Sports Center, where the 6th National Games and parts of the 2010 Asian Games were held.  It is on the same Axis as two new building developments in Guangzhou, the first being the East and West Towers in Zhujiang New City and the Pearl Observation tower.  It is surrounded by other tall buildings and is a symbol of Guangzhou's growing wealth and importance.

Tenants
All Nippon Airways operated its Guangzhou Office in 2605 CITIC Plaza until May 2, 2011. On May 3, 2011 and since then, it has been in Tower A of Victory Plaza.

Transportation
The building is accessible from Linhe West Station of Guangzhou Metro.

Floor list
CITIC Plaza elevator service floor list

 No. 1–4 (4 office rooms for 9 / F–17 / F): 1,9–17
 No. 5–8 (4 from 18 / F–26 / F office elevator): 1,18–26
 No. 9–12 (office space of 4/28 / F–37 / F): 1,28,30–37
 No. 13–16 (office space of 4/38 / F–46 / F): 1,38–46
 No. 17–20 (4 from 48 / F–58 / F office elevator): 48,50–58
 No. 21–24 (office space of 4/59 / F–66 / F): 48,59–66
 No. 25–28 (4 from the 68 / F–75 / F office elevator): 48,68,71–75
 No. 29–34 (6 shuttle lanes to and from the air lobby): 1,48
 No. 35 (fire and cargo lift): B1, 1, 6–27, 27A, 28, 30–47, 47A, 48, 50–66, 67A, 67B, 68, 71–75
 No. 36 (fire and cargo elevators): B1, 1, 6–27, 27A, 28, 30–47, 47A, 48, 50–66, 67A, 67B, 68, 71–78
 P6–P7 (parking lot dedicated elevator): B2, B1,1,6

Gallery

See also

 List of skyscrapers
 List of tallest freestanding structures in the world
 CITIC Group

References

External links
 Official Website
 CITIC Plaza Property Management Office 
 Information on the tower on architect's site

Shopping malls in Guangzhou
Skyscraper office buildings in Guangzhou
CITIC Group
Tianhe District
Tourist attractions in Guangzhou
Skyscrapers in Guangzhou
Office buildings completed in 1997